William Hoste Webb,  (24 November 1820 – 19 December 1890) was a Quebec lawyer and political figure. He represented Richmond—Wolfe in the House of Commons of Canada as a Conservative member from 1867 to 1874.

He was born in Hampshire, England in 1820. He studied at the Royal Naval School in London and came to Brompton Township in Lower Canada with his family in 1836. Webb articled in law in Montreal and was called to the bar in 1850. He served as warden for Melbourne and Richmond townships from 1855 to 1857 and from 1879 to 1883. He also served as mayor of Melbourne, was president of the Richmond Agricultural Society and served as a trustee for Saint Francis College in Richmond. In 1857, Webb was elected to the Legislative Assembly of the Province of Canada for Richmond & Wolfe. He was defeated in 1861 but reelected in 1863. Webb was named Queen's Counsel in 1867. He was elected to the federal parliament after Confederation and served until 1874. In 1875, he was named to the Legislative Council of Quebec for Wellington division and served until 1887, when he was appointed sheriff for Saint-François district. He died at Sherbrooke in 1890 from an apoplectic fit.

Electoral record

References
 
 
 The Canadian biographical dictionary and portrait gallery of eminent and self-made men... (1881)
 

1820 births
1890 deaths
Politicians from Hampshire
English emigrants to pre-Confederation Quebec
Conservative Party of Canada (1867–1942) MPs
Conservative Party of Quebec MLCs
Members of the House of Commons of Canada from Quebec
Members of the Legislative Assembly of the Province of Canada from Canada East
People educated at the Royal Naval School
Canadian King's Counsel
Immigrants to Lower Canada
Anglophone Quebec people